Say It Isn't So may refer to:

 Say It Isn't So (film), a 2001 comedy film starring Chris Klein and Heather Graham
 "Say It Isn't So" (Irving Berlin song), a 1932 song written by Irving Berlin.
 "Say It Isn't So" (Hall & Oates song), a 1983 single by Hall & Oates
 "Say It Isn't So", a song released in 1985 as a single by The Outfield from their album Play Deep
 "Say It Isn't So" (Bon Jovi song), a 2000 single by Bon Jovi
 "Say It Isn't So" (Gareth Gates song), a 2003 single by Gareth Gates

See also
 Say it ain't so (disambiguation)
 Say it ain't so, Joe (disambiguation)